Per un pugno nell'occhio is a 1965 Italian film by Michele Lupo starring the comic duo Franco and Ciccio.  It is a Spaghetti Western parody of Fistful of Dollars and was also known as Fistful of Knuckles and For a Fist in the Eye.

Plot
Fitting atmosphere in the Wild West, the film tells the story of Franco and Ciccio, two well-known arms dealers who come to a desolate village where peace reigns. Since the social situation is very quiet, the buddies start with cunning stratagems to get everyone against each other to unleash a veritable pandemonium and be able to make money.

Cast
Franco Franchi as Franco  
Ciccio Ingrassia as Ciccio  
Paco Morán as Ramon Cocos  
Lina Rosales as Consuelo  
Carmen Esbrí as Marisol  
Mónica Randall as Carmencita (as Aurora Julia)

Notes

External links
 
 Per un pugno nell'occhio at Variety Distribution

1965 films
1960s Western (genre) comedy films
1960s Italian-language films
Italian parody films
Spaghetti Western films
1960s parody films
Italian buddy films
1960s buddy films
Films scored by Francesco De Masi
1965 comedy films
1960s Italian films